This is a list of video games that were released or upcoming on Stardock Impulse and are using Impulse::Reactor or Impulse Goo. The "Reactor" column indicates titles compatible with Stardock Impulse's Reactor, which include online gaming features. Titles listed under the "Goo" column indicates titles are using Stardock Impulse's user friendly DRM Goo

When a game is released, it should be moved to the appropriate section. This list should not contain vaporware. As Impulse was sold to GameStop in 2011 and discontinued in 2014 this list will likely be static and any upcoming games won't appear on this service.

2008

2009

2010

References

External links 
 Official Stardock Impulse website
 Official Stardock website
 Impulse::Reactor FAQ
 Impulse::GOO

Impulse Reactor and Goo
I